Burton in Lonsdale Castle was in the village of Burton in Lonsdale in North Yorkshire, England.

The Pipe Rolls for the reign of Henry II record that the castle's garrison in 1129–1130 consisted of a knight, ten sergeants, a gatekeeper, and a watchman.

This was a motte castle with two baileys. In 1322 it was confiscated from the Mowbrays who had been in opposition to King Edward II.

The mound is still visible.

References
Notes

Bibliography

Fry, Plantagenet Somerset, The David & Charles Book of Castles, David & Charles, 1980. 

Castles in North Yorkshire
Motte-and-bailey castles